Call of the Desert is a 1930 American silent Western film directed by J. P. McGowan and starring Tom Tyler, Sheila Bromley and Bud Osborne. Some versions of the film were released with added sound effects.

Cast
 Tom Tyler as Rex Carson
 Sheila Bromley as Jean Walker 
 Bud Osborne as Tod Walker
 Cliff Lyons as Nate Thomas
 Bobby Dunn as Hardrock

References

Bibliography
 Pitts, Michael R. Poverty Row Studios, 1929–1940. McFarland & Company, 2005.

External links
 

1930 films
1930 Western (genre) films
American silent feature films
Silent American Western (genre) films
Films directed by J. P. McGowan
American black-and-white films
1930s English-language films
1930s American films